Juan Violá (1883–1919) was a Cuban baseball player in the Cuban League, Negro leagues and the minor leagues. He played from 1902 to 1915 with several ballclubs, including Almendares, the Habana club, the Long Branch Cubans, and the Jacksonville Jays. He was elected to the Cuban Baseball Hall of Fame in 1953.

External links

1883 births
1919 deaths
Cuban baseball players
Cuban League players
Almendares (baseball) players
Jacksonville Jays players
Long Branch Cubans players
Matanzas players
Augusta Tourists players
Jacksonville Tarpons players
Nashville Vols players
Habana players